HSD may refer to:

School districts 
 Hackett School District, in Arkansas, United States
 Harrison School District (disambiguation)
 Hazelwood School District, in Missouri, United States
 Hillsboro School District in Oregon, United States

Other uses 
 Hamstead railway station, England
 Hardanger Sunnhordlandske Dampskipsselskap, a former Norwegian transport company
 Heliophysics Science Division, a branch of the United States National Atmospheric and Space Administration
 High School Diploma
 High Speed Diesel, a diesel engine that has rated speed more than 900 RPM
 Historical Society of Delaware
 Hollywood Stunt Driver, a live show at Warner Bros. Movie World
 Homeland Security Department
 Hybrid Synergy Drive, a set of hybrid car technologies
 Hydroxysteroid dehydrogenase
 Hypoactive sexual desire, a disorder characterized as a lack or absence of sexual fantasies and desire for sexual activity
 Hypermobility spectrum disorder
 Tukey's honest significant difference test